"The Ballad of Ira Hayes" is a song written by folk singer Peter La Farge. Its words tell the story of Ira Hayes, one of the six marines who became famous for having raised the U.S. flag on Mount Suribachi during the Battle of Iwo Jima in World War II. Members of the Western Writers of America chose it as one of the Top 100 Western songs of all time.

Content

In the song, La Farge introduces the Pima Indians, a tribe that occupied an oasis in the Arizona desert. He then claims that when the U.S. started settling the area in the late 19th century, "the white men stole their water rights and the sparkling water stopped," plunging the tribe into poverty. The song then introduces Hayes, who volunteers for the U.S. Marine Corps (forgetting, in La Farge's words, "the white man's greed") and participates in the raising of the flag on Iwo Jima.

When Hayes returns home, he faces discomfort and hostility. Even Americans' attempts to honor Hayes are treated with contempt in La Farge's lyrics ("they let him raise the flag and lower it, like you'd throw a dog a bone."). Rejected by even his own people ("back home, nobody cared what Ira'd done, and when do the Indians dance"), Ira descends into alcoholism and dies drunk in a ditch. La Farge again uses Hayes's death to call attention to the Pimas' current plight: "but his land is just as dry(!)"

Recordings

The song has been recorded many times. The most popular version is by Johnny Cash, which he recorded for the Bitter Tears concept album (containing mostly La Farge compositions) and reached number three on the Billboard Country Singles chart in 1964. Patrick Sky covered it on his self-titled 1965 debut album (and later for a 1985 album). Hamilton Camp included the song on his 1969 album, Welcome to Hamilton Camp.

Pete Seeger covered the song on his 1963 album Broadside Ballads Volume 2.

Patrick Sky covered the song on his eponymous 1965 debut album.

Townes Van Zandt covered this song at Carnegie Hall in 1969, during a rare television appearance, and at The Whole Coffeehouse, University of Minnesota Campus, November 9, 1973.

Smiley Bates covered the song on his 1971 album Songs of Life.

Bob Dylan followed suit by covering the song during his sessions for Self Portrait (released in 1970), though his version did not see release until Columbia used it as part of the Dylan album of 1973.  On November 16, 1975, Dylan performed the song live at the Tuscarora Reservation, and this rendition appears on the 2019 box set The Rolling Thunder Revue: The 1975 Live Recordings and in the 2019 film Rolling Thunder Revue: A Bob Dylan Story by Martin Scorsese.

Kinky Friedman did a cover of the song on his 1976 record Lasso from El Paso.

The song was also covered by Hazel Dickens on her 1983 bluegrass album From the Sweat of my Brow.

Kris Kristofferson sings the song on a tribute remake of Bitter Tears, released in 2014.

See also
 List of anti-war songs

References 

Songs about soldiers
Songs about the military
Bob Dylan songs
Johnny Cash songs
Works about the United States Marine Corps
Columbia Records singles